Lansquenet was one of seven s built for the French Navy in the first decade of the 20th century.

Design and description
The Spahi-class was over 50 percent larger than the preceding  to match the increase in size of foreign destroyers. The ships displaced  at deep load. Their crew numbered 77–79 officers and men.

Lansquenet was powered by two triple-expansion steam engines, each driving one propeller shaft using steam provided by four Normand boilers.

The primary armament of the Spahi-class ships consisted of six  Modèle 1902 guns in single mounts, one each fore and aft of the superstructure and the others were distributed amidships. They were also fitted with three  torpedo tubes. One of these was in a fixed mount in the bow and the other two were on single rotating mounts amidships.

Construction and career
Lansquenet was ordered from Dyle et Bacalan and was launched at their shipyard in Bordeaux on 20 November 1909. She was completed in October 1910.

References

Bibliography

 

Spahi-class destroyers
Ships built by Dyle et Bacalan
1909 ships